The 2004 IBF World Junior Championships was an international badminton tournament held in Richmond, Canada.

Medalists

Team competition
A total of 20 countries competed at the team competition in 2004 IBF World Junior Championships.

Final positions

Final Round

Individual competitions

Boys Singles

Seeded

  Chen Jin (champion)
  Gong Weijie (final)
  Hwang Jung-hoon (semi-final)
  Lee Cheol-ho (semi-final)
  Chen Tianyu (quarter-final)
  Han Ki-hoon (third round)
  Hong Ji-hoon (fourth round)
  Lu Qicheng (quarter-final)
  Azrihanif Azahar (fourth round)
  Chu Han-chou (second round)
  Anand Pawar (second round)
  Jun Tamura (third round)
  Aaron Tan (third round)
  Sittichai Viboonsin (quarter-final)
  Ari Yuli Wahyu (second round)
  Markus Wijanu (third round)

Finals

Top half

Section 1

Section 2

Section 3

Section 4

Bottom half

Section 5

Section 6

Section 7

Section 8

Girls Singles

Seeded

  Jiang Yanjiao (quarter-final)
  Lu Lan (final)
  Wang Lin (semi-final)
  Wang Yihan (quarter-final)
  Cheng Shao-chieh (champion)
  Ha Jung-eun (semi-final)
  Jang Soo-young (quarter-final)
  Kim Mi-young (quarter-final)

Finals

Top half

Section 1

Section 2

Section 3

Section 4

Bottom half

Section 5

Section 6

Section 7

Section 8

Boys Doubles

Seeded

  Yoo Yeon-seong / Jeon Jun-bum (semi-final)
  Lee Yong-dae / Jung Jung-young (final)
  Shen Ye / He Hanbin (semi-final)
  Li Rui / Cao Liu (quarter-final)
  Fang Chieh-min / Lee Sheng-mu (quarter-final)
  Hoon Thien How / Tan Boon Heong (champion)
  Kazuaki Oshima / Jun Tamura (second round)
  Muhammad Rijal / I Made Agung (quarter-final)

Finals

Top half

Section 1

Section 2

Bottom half

Section 3

Section 4

Girls Doubles

Seeded

  Tian Qing / Yu Yang (champion)
  Feng Chen / Pan Pan (final)
  Greysia Polii / Heni Budiman (semi-final)
  Ha Jung-eun / Oh Seul-ki (semi-final)
  Christinna Pedersen / Tinne Kruse (quarter-final)
  Kana Mizuma / Yuina Kimura (second round)
  Hsieh Pei-chen / Tsai Pei-ling (quarter-final)
  Park So-ri / Park Soo-hee (quarter-final)

Finals

Top half

Section 1

Section 2

Bottom half

Section 3

Section 4

Mixed doubles

Seeded

  Shen Ye / Feng Chen (quarter-final)
  Yoo Yeon-seong / Ha Jung-eun (quarter-final)
  Lee Yong-dae / Park Soo-hee (semi-final)
  He Hanbin / Yu Yang (champion)
  Li Rui / Tian Qing (quarter-final)
  Lee Sheng-mu / Cheng Shao-chieh (semi-final)
  Rasmus Bonde / Christinna Pedersen (second round)
  Muhammad Rijal / Greysia Polii (final)

Finals

Top half

Section 1

Section 2

Bottom half

Section 3

Section 4

Medal table

References

External links
World Junior Team Championship 2004 at tournamentsoftware.com
World Junior Championship 2004 at tournamentsoftware.com

BWF World Junior Championships
World Junior Championships, 2004
World Junior Championships, 2004
Badminton tournaments in Canada
International sports competitions hosted by Canada
2004 in youth sport